Poosapati / Pusapati was the ruling clan of the Northern Andhra region, Vizianagaram.

History

The Pericchedi kings were ancestors of the Pusapati royal family who built Bezawada (Modern Vijayawada) off the river Krishna by 626 AD and another capital in Kollipaka establishing themselves for nine centuries there. The family name was changed to Pusapati after moving to the coastal region. The first Pusapati chieftain Sitaram Raju received the villages of Kumuli and Gundredu from Maharaja Krishan Dev of Jeypore kingdom.  Viziaram Raz served as the minister in the court of Maharaja Ram Chandra Dev and later founded the city of Vizianagaram after occupying some of the coastal territories of Jeypore due to a feud between the king and his brother, Balaram Dev III. Viziaram also led the other zamindars gain independence from the feudalism of Jeypore.

Vizianagaram is named after this Pusapati Vijay Rama Raju and is spelled with a Z to differentiate it from the Vijayanagar Dynasty in Hampi. They obtained the title of Gajapathi in the 16th century, after defeating the Gajapatis of Jeypore in the battle of Nandapur (old capital of Jeypore), in the Northern Circars, and have used since then.

Emperor Aurangzeb gave them a two-edged sword 'pattaa kaththi' (Telugu:పట్టాకత్తి) (Zulfiqar), which is still used in the coat-of-arms of the family. By 1713 they erected the fort at Vizianagaram where they have since resided. In 1827 Maharajah Vijay Rama Gajapati Raju III. had several honors conferred on him by the British Government. Lord Northbrook obtained for him the title of His Highness, and had his name enrolled among those of chiefs entitled to return visits from the Viceroy with a 13 gun salute.

Poosapati / Pusapati rulers

Up to 1509 A.D. The Pusapatis were ruling in Vijayawada, They were referred to as descendants of Madhava Varma of Bezawada, as that is what Vijayawada was called at the time.
Pusapati Rachi Raju (1515 A.D.)
Pusapati Amala Raju (Founder)
Pusapati Tama Bhupaludu (1620–1670)
Pusapati Sita Rama Chandra Raju (ruled 1685–1697) In 1687 A.D. when Mughal emperor Aurangzeb conquered Golkonda, Sita Rama Chandra Raju obtained the Zulfikar (Two edged sword) that figures on the Pusapati flag from the emperor as a token of appreciation for having assisted him in his campaign.
Pusapati Vijayarama Gajapati Raju I (ruled 1710 – died 1757) (Founder of Vizianagaram, moved the capital from Potnur) Killed in the Battle of Bobbili
Pasupati Ananda Raju (died 1760) Captured Visakhapatnam and Rajamundry
Pusapati Vijayarama Gajapati Raju II (1760–1794) Died in the battle of Padmanabham against the British. Vijaya Rama Raju's brother Sita Rama Raju attacked Parlakamedi along with their Maratha allies and conquered it.
Pusapati Narayana Babu Raju (1794–1845)
Pusapati Vijaya Rama Gajapati Raju (1845–1879)
Pusapati Ananda Gajapati Raju (1850–1897)
Pusapati Vijaya Rama Gajapati Raju (1897–1922)
Pusapati Alaka Narayana Gajapati Raju (1922–1937)
Pusapati Vijaya Rama Gajapati Raju (1924–1995)
Pusapati Ananda Gajapati Raju (1950–2016)
Pusapati Ashok Gajapati Raju (1951–)

Notable members
 Poosapati S Kumaraswamy Raja - Former Chief Minister of Madras Presidency (Tamil Nadu) (1949–52) and Governor of Orissa (1954–56).
Sir Pusapati Vijayananda Gajapathi Raju also known as Maharajkumar of Vizianagram or Vizzy - Former Indian cricketer, Cricket administrator and Politician.

References

 
 

Medieval India
Hindu dynasties
Telugu monarchs
Dynasties of India
Empires and kingdoms of India
Raju
Indian surnames
Surnames
Telugu-language surnames
Social groups of Andhra Pradesh
Culture of Andhra Pradesh
Suryavansha
Kshatriya communities